Kurt Krause (April 20, 1883 in Potsdam – November 19, 1963 in Berlin) was a German botanist who wrote 33 articles and five books on the flora and vegetation of Turkey. Between 1933 and 1939, he was a professor of botany at the Ankara Agricultural Institute. Krause retired in 1950.

References

1883 births
20th-century German botanists
German non-fiction writers
Ankara University people
1963 deaths
Scientists from Potsdam
20th-century non-fiction writers